Francesco Raffaele Pizzi (born 12 November 2004) is an Italian racing driver racing in the 2023 USF Pro 2000 Championship with TJ Speed Motorsports. He most recently competed for Charouz Racing System in the 2022 FIA Formula 3 Championship. He was the vice-champion of the 2020 Italian F4 Championship and drove for Van Amersfoort Racing in the 2021 Formula Regional European Championship. 
In 2023 he won Rolex 24h Daytona, in LMP2 class, with team Proton Competition, in doing so on his debut he became the 3rd youngest ever class winner in the historical race.

Career

Karting 
In 2013 aged 8 Francesco claimed his maiden win under the rain in the race 2 in Lonato of formula 60 Italian championship.
Pizzi made his international karting debut in the Mini ROK International Final in 2014, where he finished ninth. He raced in the 60 Mini class for three years, winning the South Garda Winter Cup in 2016 and becoming vice-champion in the WSK Super Master Series and WSK Champions Cup respectively that same year. The Italian then moved up to drive in the OKJ-category, placing third in the Italian Championship in 2017. He competed in karts until 2019.

Lower formulae 
In January 2020 Pizzi made his single-seater debut with Xcel Motorsport in the Formula 4 UAE Championship. He had a perfect opening round, winning all three races at the first weekend in Dubai. He scored five more victories and won the championship, 26 points ahead of his nearest competitor Lorenzo Fluxá.

The Italian then signed with Van Amersfoort Racing to compete in the Italian F4 Championship, as the team's sole full-time entrant. He started the campaign strongly, taking three podiums, including a win, at the first round in Misano, however, his next win would only come at the fifth round in Monza. Despite two wins at that weekend Pizzi had already lost too much ground to his title rival Gabriele Minì, and in the end finished second, with seven podiums and 208 points to his name.

Formula Regional European Championship 

In December 2020 Pizzi took part in the post-season rookie test for the Formula Regional European Championship for ART Grand Prix alongside his F4 title rival Gabriele Minì and Grégoire Saucy. After a second test later that month, where Pizzi returned to Van Amersfoort Racing and set the third-fastest laptime of the day, the Dutch team confirmed Pizzi to be one of their drivers for the 2021 season. The Italian scored his first points of the season at the Zandvoort Circuit, finishing fifth in the second race. Another points finish at the Red Bull Ring helped Pizzi to finish 20th in the standings. Following the conclusion to the season Pizzi announced his departure from VAR and took part in winter testing with Arden in Barcelona , R-ace GP in Paul Ricard and Monza, MP Motorsport in the second Barcelona test and FA Racing in Mugello.

FIA Formula 3 Championship 
For 2022 Pizzi progressed to the FIA Formula 3 Championship, partnering László Tóth and Ayrton Simmons at Charouz Racing System. Talking about his sudden move to F3 after just two years of car racing, Pizzi stated that "it's going to be tough, but that's why we race". Pizzi scored his first and only points of the year, having finished in tenth place during the Imola sprint race. In Spa-Francorchamps, Pizzi qualified an astonishing third. During the feature race, Pizzi was pushed wide at the side, and later Kush Maini spun him round which dropped him to the back and left Pizzi to finish 21st. Overall, Pizzi was the only driver in Charouz to score a point for the team that year, having scored his only top-10 finish at Imola, having finished 27th in the standings, the last placed driver to have scored points.

At the end of the 2022 season, Pizzi partook in the post-season testing with Campos Racing during the first and last day respectively.

USF Pro Championship 
At the end of October 2022, Pizzi took part in a USF Pro 2000 Championship test at the Indianapolis Motor Speedway with Jay Howard Driver Development. At the start of January the following year, Pizzi confirmed that he would leave Formula 3 and join the 2023 USF Pro 2000 Championship with TJ Speed Motorsports.
He debuted in St. Petersburg claiming two front row starts, a pole position and a fastest lap on his first time driving the tricky street circuit, he couldn't finish on the podium in any of the races claiming a 4th and a 5th place.

Endurance racing 
Pizzi made his endurance racing debut at the 2023 24 Hours of Daytona, teaming up with Proton Competition in the LMP2 category.
He ended up winning the race by 16 thousands of a second on his debut becoming the 3rd youngest ever class winner in the race.
The win came after an impressive comeback from him and his team mates after qualifying in last following a wreck, they were able to claim the race lead after a quarter of the race had been gone but found themselves 3 laps down with 4 hours to go, thanks to FCY procedures they made it back to the lead lap with the Italian on the car who then left the car in the hand of his team mate James Allen for the last hour.

Karting record

Karting career summary

Complete Karting World Championship results

Racing record

Racing career summary

Complete Formula 4 UAE Championship results 
(key) (Races in bold indicate pole position; races in italics indicate fastest lap)

Complete Italian F4 Championship results 
(key) (Races in bold indicate pole position) (Races in italics indicate fastest lap)

Complete Formula Regional European Championship results 
(key) (Races in bold indicate pole position) (Races in italics indicate fastest lap)

† Driver did not finish the race, but was classified as they completed more than 90% of the race distance.

Complete FIA Formula 3 Championship results 
(key) (Races in bold indicate pole position) (Races in italics indicate fastest lap)

Complete WeatherTech SportsCar Championship results
(key) (Races in bold indicate pole position; results in italics indicate fastest lap)

American open-wheel racing results

USF Pro 2000 Championship 
(key) (Races in bold indicate pole position) (Races in italics indicate fastest lap) (Races with * indicate most race laps led)

References

External links 
 
 

2004 births
Living people
Racing drivers from Rome
Italian racing drivers
Italian F4 Championship drivers
ADAC Formula 4 drivers
Formula Regional European Championship drivers
FIA Formula 3 Championship drivers
Van Amersfoort Racing drivers
Charouz Racing System drivers
Karting World Championship drivers
UAE F4 Championship drivers
WeatherTech SportsCar Championship drivers